The High Commissioner for Diaspora Affairs of Armenia is a government position in Armenia in charge of coordinating and developing the country's relations with the Armenian diaspora. It was established on June 11, 2019 to replace the now-defunct Ministry of Diaspora.

References

External links
 Official website

Government ministries of Armenia
Armenian diaspora